Jake Butler-Fleming (born 8 January 1992) is an Australian rugby league footballer.

A Penrith Panthers junior, Butler-Fleming played for the Wentworthville Magpies before being signed by Hull Kingston Rovers in the Super League in late 2016.

In December 2017 he signed a one-year with York for 2018 having played for them on loan during the 2017 season, he eventually earned a full-time contract with the Toronto Wolfpack.

References

External links
Toronto Wolfpack profile
Hull KR profile
https://everythingrugbyleague.com/jake-enjoying-time-with-the-queanbeyan-blues-brothers/ (2021)

1992 births
Living people
Australian rugby league players
Bradford Bulls players
Hull Kingston Rovers players
Rugby league centres
Rugby league players from Penrith, New South Wales
Rugby league wingers
Toronto Wolfpack players
Wentworthville Magpies players
York City Knights players